Us Two may refer to:

 "Us Two" (song), a song from the stage musical Chitty Chitty Bang Bang
 Us Two (film), a 1979 Canadian-French drama film